East Kyo is a small hamlet in County Durham, England. It is situated a short distance to the west of Stanley, close to Annfield Plain, West Kyo, Oxhill and Harperley.   The hamlet of East Kyo consists of two farms and East Kyo House, a former public house.

References

Villages in County Durham
Stanley, County Durham